Infeld may refer to:

 Leopold Infeld (1898–1968), Polish physicist.
 Born–Infeld model, an example of nonlinear electrodynamics.
 Emily Infeld (born 1990), American long-distance runner. 
 Thomastik-Infeld, Austrian company that makes strings for instruments.
 Einstein–Infeld–Hoffmann equations, equations of motion.